Walisson Moreira Farias Maia (born 21 August 1991), known as Walisson Maia, is a Brazilian footballer who plays as a central defender club SHB Đà Nẵng.

Club career
Born in Natividade, Tocantins, Walisson graduated with Coritiba's youth setup. On 5 June 2011 he made his first team – and Série A – debut, starting in a 5–1 home routing over Vasco da Gama.

After being demoted to the reserves, Walisson was subsequently loaned to Ituano, Fortaleza, ASA, J. Malucelli, Boa Esporte and Atlético Sorocaba. With the Alagoas club he scored his first professional goal, netting his side's first in a 2–3 away loss against Boa for the Série B championship on 7 September 2012.

On 29 September 2014 Walisson was again promoted to the main squad, along with fellow youth graduate Rafhael Lucas.

In January 2018, having renewed his Coritiba contract until the end of 2019, he joined Vitória for the 2018 season.

Career statistics

References

External links
Coritiba profile 

1991 births
Living people
Sportspeople from Tocantins
Brazilian footballers
Association football defenders
Campeonato Brasileiro Série A players
Campeonato Brasileiro Série B players
Coritiba Foot Ball Club players
Ituano FC players
Fortaleza Esporte Clube players
Agremiação Sportiva Arapiraquense players
J. Malucelli Futebol players
Boa Esporte Clube players
Clube Atlético Sorocaba players
Esporte Clube Vitória players
Brazilian expatriate footballers
Al-Fahaheel FC players
Kuwait Premier League players
Expatriate footballers in Kuwait
Brazilian expatriate sportspeople in Kuwait
Esporte Clube Água Santa players
Botafogo Futebol Clube (SP) players
Vila Nova Futebol Clube players